Karin Nansen is an activist from Uruguay. In 1988, she was the founding member of REDES/Friends of the Earth Uruguay. She became the Chair of Friends of the Earth International in 2016; her two terms ended in June 2021.

References 

Living people

Year of birth missing (living people)